"Life's a Funny Proposition After All" is a song written by George M. Cohan from the 1904 Broadway musical Little Johnny Jones.

At the close of the first season of HBO television series Boardwalk Empire in 2010, Stephen DeRosa, portraying Eddie Cantor, performs the song.

References

Songs from Little Johnny Jones
1904 songs
Songs written by George M. Cohan